Arjunan is an Indian actor who has appeared in supporting roles in predominately Tamil-language films. He made his breakthrough portraying Siva, a hopeless college romantic, in Balaji Mohan's bilingual film, Kadhalil Sodhappuvadhu Yeppadi (2012), winning critical acclaim for his portrayal.  He has since featured in comedy roles in films including Suseendran's Aadhalal Kadhal Seiveer and in Balaji Mohan's next bilingual Vaayai Moodi Pesavum (2014).

Career
Arjunan made his breakthrough with Balaji Mohan's bilingual romantic comedy Kadhalil Sodhappuvadhu Yeppadi portraying Siddharth's friend Siva, a hopeless romantic. The film, a remake of a short film by the director, which Arjunan also featured in saw him double up duty as an assistant director.  A critic from The Hindu noted "despite appearing gawky and untrained as an actors",  he "makes that up by being natural and uninhibited."  After winning good reviews, he went on to feature in Siddharth's next Telugu film Jabardasth (2013) and then played a supporting role in Suseendran's Aadhalal Kadhal Seiveer, where a critic praised his contribution, writing he "ensures some laughs even in the most serious scenes."  Arjunan next played a supporting role in Balaji Mohans's following bilingual film, Vaayai Moodi Pesavum.

He has several films in production including Ravi K. Chandran's Yaan and Anand Shankar's Arima Nambi. Arjunan will also be seen in a major role in the forthcoming Anirudh-musical Aakko.

Filmography
All films are in Tamil, unless otherwise noted.

Television series

References

External links

Living people
Film producers from Chennai
Male actors in Tamil cinema
Indian male film actors
21st-century Indian male actors
Tamil comedians
1986 births
Male actors from Chennai
Indian male comedians